Tsertsvadze is a Georgian surname that may refer to:
 Aleksandr Tsertsvadze (born 1977), Georgian wrestler
 Gia Tsertsvadze, Georgian accused of committing murder and attempted murder in Russia in 2003

Surnames of Georgian origin
Georgian-language surnames